Kayavoor is a village in the Pattukkottai taluk of Thanjavur district, Tamil Nadu, India.

Demographics 

As per the 2001 census, Kayavoor had a total population of 1422 with 679 males and 743 females. The sex ratio was 1094. The literacy rate was 59.7.

References 

 

Villages in Thanjavur district